Ernesto Köhler (4 December 1849 – 17 March 1907) was an Italian flautist and composer. He was considered one of the best flautists of his era.

Born in Modena, Köhler was taught the flute by his father, Venceslau Joseph Köhler, who was the first flute of the Duke of Modena's orchestra. He moved to Vienna in 1869 as a flautist, and then became a member of the orchestra of the Imperial Opera in Saint Petersburg beginning in 1871.

Noted as a composer for flute, Köhler wrote over 100 works for the instrument: études, duets, and solos. He also produced an opera and several ballets. He is well known among flute players for "Flöten-Schule" (c. 1880), his popular method for learning the flute, and for Progress in Flute Playing (his Opus 33, published in the 1880s), a series of three progressive instructional books for the flute player.

Köhler also had ties to the mandolin community; he is credited with writing an early mandolin method, Mandolinen Schule, self instructor for the mandolin, first published in 1887. His  mandolin method is thought to be the first mandolin method published in Russian. His publisher was Julius Heinrich Zimmermann.

Ernesto Köhler died in Saint Petersburg on 17 March 1907.

References

Sources
Köhler's Page
 Inside cover biography of Ernesto Köhler, "Progress in Flute playing (Op.33) Book 3: 8 Advanced studies", Chester Music, edited by Edward Blakeman http://www.chesternovello.com/default.aspx

External links
 

1849 births
1907 deaths
19th-century classical composers
19th-century Italian male musicians
20th-century classical composers
20th-century Italian composers
20th-century Italian male musicians
Italian classical composers
Italian classical flautists
Italian male classical composers
Italian people of German descent
Italian Romantic composers
20th-century flautists